Suzanna Zeisberger (1744-1824) was a missionary of the Moravian Church.
Susanna was born February 17, 1744, in Lancaster, Pennsylvania. She moved to Lititz, when she was sixteen years old and lived in the Single Sisters House. She married the Moravian missionary David Zeisberger on May 4, 1781. Susanna was confirmed as a deaconess six days later on May 10, 1781, and became a missionary to the Native American lands in the Ohio Valley. Susanna and her husband were missionaries in the years following the Gnadenhutten massacre of 1782.

After the massacre, the Zeisbergers fled to Schönbrunn where they were captured on September 3, 1782.

Susanna died in 1824 in Lititz, PA.

References

Female Christian missionaries